Taylor Smith (born July 23, 1991) is an American basketball player for Scaligera Verona of the LBA. He played college basketball for Stephen F. Austin State University.

College career 
Smith, a 6'6" forward from Schertz, Texas, played two seasons at McLennan Community College before enrolling at Stephen F. Austin (SFA).  As a senior in the 2012–13 season, Smith led NCAA Division I in field goal percentage after converting 69.4% of his attempts.  He averaged 15.7 points, 9.2 rebounds and 2.8 blocked shots per game and at the end of the season was named the Southland Conference Player of the Year.  A few weeks later, Smith was also named an honorable mention All-American by the Associated Press.

Professional career
On June 24, 2019, he has signed a contract with Nanterre 92 of the LNB Pro A. Smith averaged 7.8 points, 4.7 rebounds and 1 block per game in 2019-20.

On May 6, 2020, he signed with Mornar of the ABA League. After contributing 22 points and 6 rebounds in a victory over KK Krka, Smith was named league player of the week on November 10.

On August 4, 2022, he has signed with Scaligera Verona of the LBA.

References

External links
Kolossos Rodou profile
Stephen F. Austin profile

1991 births
Living people
American expatriate basketball people in France
American expatriate basketball people in Greece
American expatriate basketball people in Italy
American expatriate basketball people in Montenegro
American men's basketball players
Basketball players from Texas
BCM Gravelines players
Centers (basketball)
Junior college men's basketball players in the United States
Kolossos Rodou B.C. players
KK Mornar Bar players
McLennan Community College alumni
Nanterre 92 players
Power forwards (basketball)
Scaligera Basket Verona players
Small forwards
Stephen F. Austin Lumberjacks basketball players